Lobelia arnhemiaca is a herb found in Western Australia, Northern Territory and Queensland.

References
 Florabase profile
 Campanulaceae (pdf file)

arnhemiaca
Flora of Western Australia
Flora of the Northern Territory
Flora of Queensland